Zagorzyce may refer to the following places:
Zagorzyce, Kuyavian-Pomeranian Voivodeship (north-central Poland)
Zagorzyce, Lesser Poland Voivodeship (south Poland)
Zagorzyce, Subcarpathian Voivodeship (south-east Poland)
Zagorzyce, Świętokrzyskie Voivodeship (south-central Poland)

Zagórzyce may refer to the following places:
Zagórzyce, Lower Silesian Voivodeship (south-west Poland)
Zagórzyce, Łódź Voivodeship (central Poland)
Zagórzyce, Kazimierza County in Świętokrzyskie Voivodeship (south-central Poland)
Zagórzyce, Pińczów County in Świętokrzyskie Voivodeship (south-central Poland)
Zagórzyce, West Pomeranian Voivodeship (north-west Poland)